A list of arches dedicated to or by the Roman emperor Claudius.

Rome

Aqua Virgo
One of the arches of the Aqua Virgo, which spanned an ancient street, and was restored in monumental form by Claudius (CIL VI.1252). This arch is still standing, in the court of No. 14 Via del Nazareno (Jord. I.1.472; HJ 457), and is probably referred to by Martial IV.18. as date is 46 A.D.

British triumph

German victories
An arch intended to be erected in honour of Claudius' victories in Germany (Dio LX.8 for victories by his generals over the Cauchi and the Chatti in 41 A.D.) is shown in several of his coins of 41 A.D. (and following years) (Cohen, Nero Drusus 1‑6; Claud. 25‑29, 48; BM Imp. Claud. 2, 36, 95‑103, 121‑123, 187‑191). Whether it was actually erected, and if so, where, is uncertain (BM Imp. p. clii).

Empire
Rutupiae
Boulogne-sur-Mer
Cyzicus

See also
List of Roman triumphal arches
List of ancient monuments in Rome

Claudius
Claudius
Ancient Rome-related lists
Claudius